Albert Ambrose Pilcher (8 August 1878 – 11 October 1948) was an Australian rules footballer who played for the Melbourne Football Club in the Victorian Football League (VFL).

Notes

External links 

 

1878 births
1948 deaths
Australian rules footballers from Victoria (Australia)
Melbourne Football Club players